Jaques (variously  and ) is one of the main characters in Shakespeare's As You Like It. "The melancholy Jaques", as he is known, is one of the exiled Duke Senior's noblemen who live with him in the Forest of Arden. Jaques takes no part in the unfolding of the plot and confines himself to wry comment on the action and exchanges with his fellow characters. He has one of Shakespeare's best-known speeches, "All the world's a stage".

Role         

Shakespeare took much of the plot and most of the principal characters of As You Like It from Thomas Lodge's pastoral romance Rosalynd, published in 1590. He added nine new characters, chief among whom are the jester  Touchstone and Jaques. The former is cheerful and optimistic; the latter introverted and pessimistic. Dame Helen Gardner has described Touchstone as the parodist who must love what he parodies, and Jaques as the cynic who cannot be cured of melancholy because he likes himself as he is. Clement Scott contrasted Touchstone "the licensed whipper of affectations, the motley mocker of the time" with Jaques, "the blasé sentimentalist and cynical Epicurean" – "happy harmonising of two moods of folly". Neither character helps to advance the plot, and as commentators on the action they act as a link between the poet and the audience. Albert H. Tolman comments that Jaques is a fortunate addition by Shakespeare: "His pungent comments upon those about him and on human life relieve the general tone of sugary romanticism".

In his study of Shakespeare's characters (1817) William Hazlitt wrote:

The character is introduced at second hand, at the beginning of Act II, when one of the banished Duke's attendant lords describes Jaques' distress at the killing of a deer to feed the exiles, and his comparison of the seeming unconcern of the other deer with the indifference of humanity to the troubles of fellow humans. When first seen in person, Jaques is calling for an encore to "Under the Greenwood Tree", a song sung by Amiens, one of the Duke's retinue. Amiens objects that this will make Jaques still more melancholy; he replies that this pleases him, and after Amiens has obliged with another verse, he adds a satirical verse of his own, wryly saying that he and his colleagues are fools to have abandoned their "wealth and ease, a stubborn will to please".

Jaques' second appearance in the play shows him in an unmelancholy and delighted frame of mind, after an offstage encounter with Touchstone – "A fool, a fool! I met a fool i' the forest". Jaques is seized with the idea that he has found his true vocation, and bids his comrades "Invest me in my motley" so that he can become a professional jester. Later in the same scene (Act II, scene 7) he has his most famous speech, often called "The Seven Ages of Man", in which he gives brief depictions of the stages of a man's life from cradle to old age:
                            All the world's a stage,
      And all the men and women merely players:
      They have their exits and their entrances;
      And one man in his time plays many parts,
      His acts being seven ages...
Kenneth Muir has observed that the speech "is a variation on the motto of the new theatre to which Shakespeare’s company had recently moved". In a study of Shakespeare's melancholics, W. I. D. Scott comments that this "lends support to the conception of Jaques as a commentating mouthpiece with views on life at the pessimistic extreme of Shakespeare's own, balanced by the optimism of the other commentator, Touchstone".

Later in the play Jaques has scenes with Orlando (by whose romantic feelings for Rosalind he is exasperated), Touchstone (whom he advises to marry in church, if he must marry at all, rather than in the forest by a clergyman of dubious reputation) and Rosalind, who gently mocks his affectations. At the end of the play, when the lovers are united and the banished Duke is about to be restored to his duchy, Jaques declares his intention to join the usurping Duke, who has renounced his usurpation and become a hermit. He bids the others farewell:
    To Duke Senior
        You to your former honour I bequeath;
        Your patience and your virtue well deserves it:
    To Orlando
        You to a love that your true faith doth merit:
    To Oliver
        You to your land and love and great allies:
    To Silvius
        You to a long and well-deserved bed:
    To Touchstone
        And you to wrangling; for thy loving voyage
        Is but for two months victuall'd. So, to your pleasures:
        I am for other than for dancing measures.

Pronunciation
In The Oxford Dictionary of Original Shakespearean Pronunciation, David Crystal writes that the name has two different pronunciations in the play. The scansion of the blank verse requires it to be "Jayks") at some points and "Jayqueez" at others. The monosyllabic version is used for comic effect at times: "jakes" was 16th-century slang for "privy", and in one scene Touchstone refers to Jaques as "Master What-ye-call't" rather than say the coarse word "jakes" in mixed company.

Notes, references and sources

Notes

References

Sources
 
 
 
 
 
 
 
 
 

Male Shakespearean characters
Literary characters introduced in 1600
As You Like It
Fictional exiles
Fictional nobility